The Party of Workers' Self-Government (Partiya samoupravleniya trudyashchikhsya, PST) was a political party in Russia.

History
The party was established by Svyatoslav Fyodorov. In the 1995 parliamentary elections the party received 4% of the proportional representation vote, failing to cross the electoral threshold. However, it won a single constituency seat in the State Duma. Fyodorov contested the presidential elections the following year, finishing sixth out eleven candidates with 0.9% of the vote.

The party did not contest any further elections; Fyodorov formed a new alliance, the Andreii Nikolayev and Svyatoslav Fyodorov Bloc, which won one seat.

References

Defunct socialist parties in Russia
Social democratic parties in Russia